Porlock is a coastal village in Somerset, England,  west of Minehead. At the 2011 census, the village had a population of 1,440.

In 2017, Porlock had the highest percentage of elderly population in Britain, with over 40% being of pensionable age as of 2010.

History

East of the village is Bury Castle, an Iron Age hill fort.

There is evidence for 10th or 11th century origin for the name Porlock as Portloc or Portloca meaning enclosure by the harbour, from the Old English port and loca, and in the Domesday Book the village was known as "Portloc". In 914 the Vikings plundered Porlock.

Porlock was part of the hundred of Carhampton.

The area has links with several Romantic poets, and R. D. Blackmore, the author of Lorna Doone, and is popular with visitors. The visitor centre has exhibits and displays about the local area. Also on display are the bones of an aurochs, discovered on Porlock beach in 1999.

Governance

The parish council has responsibility for local issues, including setting an annual precept (local rate) to cover the council's operating costs and producing annual accounts for public scrutiny. The parish council evaluates local planning applications and works with the local police, district council officers, and neighbourhood watch groups on matters of crime, security, and traffic. The parish council's role also includes initiating projects for the maintenance and repair of parish facilities, as well as consulting with the district council on the maintenance, repair, and improvement of highways, drainage, footpaths, public transport, and street cleaning. Conservation matters (including trees and listed buildings) and environmental issues are also the responsibility of the council.

The village falls within the non-metropolitan district of Somerset West and Taunton, which was established on 1 April 2019. It was previously in the district of West Somerset, which was formed on 1 April 1974 under the Local Government Act 1972, and part of Williton Rural District before that. The district council is responsible for local planning and building control, local roads, council housing, environmental health, markets and fairs, refuse collection and recycling, cemeteries and crematoria, leisure services, parks, and tourism.

Somerset County Council is responsible for running the largest and most expensive local services such as education, social services, libraries, main roads, public transport, policing and fire services, trading standards, waste disposal and strategic planning.

As Porlock falls within the Exmoor National Park some functions normally administered by district or county councils have, since 1997, fallen under the Exmoor National Park Authority, which is known as a 'single purpose' authority, which aims to "conserve and enhance the natural beauty, wildlife and cultural heritage of the National Parks" and "promote opportunities for the understanding and enjoyment of the special qualities of the Parks by the public", including responsibility for the conservation of the historic environment.

Porlock has an electoral ward called 'Porlock and District' but this stretches westwards to the Devon boundary, eastwards to Minehead and south to Wootton Courtenay. The total population of the ward at the 2011 census was 2,338.

It is also part of the Bridgwater and West Somerset county constituency represented in the House of Commons of the Parliament of the United Kingdom. It elects one Member of Parliament (MP) by the first past the post system of election. Prior to Brexit in 2020 it was part of the South West England constituency of the European Parliament.

Geography

The village adjoins the Porlock Ridge and Saltmarsh nature reserve, created from the lowland behind a high shingle embankment which was breached by the sea in the 1990s, which has now been designated as a Site of Special Scientific Interest. Copses of white dead trees remind the visitor of when this was freshwater pasture.

A stream flows down a wooded combe called Hawkcombe leads about three miles (5 km) from the village up to high open moorland. The stream, called "Hawkcombe Waters", runs past a Victorian hunting lodge, called The Cleeve, then underground beneath the Overstream Hotel in the centre of the village.

The South West Coast Path goes through Porlock, many walkers stopping rather than continuing the long walk to Lynton. There is also a 'Coleridge Way' walk.

Culbone Church is said to be the smallest church in England. The main structure is 12th century. Services are still held there, despite the lack of road access – Culbone is a two-mile (3 km) walk from Porlock Weir, and some 3–4 miles (about 6 km) from Porlock itself.

A toll road bypasses the 1 in 4 gradient on Porlock Hill. There is the prehistoric Porlock Stone Circle on the hill.

Submerged forest

At low tide the remains of a submerged forest can be seen on Porlock Beach. The area was several miles inland until the sea level in the Bristol Channel rose about 7000 to 8000 years ago.

Church

The Church of St Dubricius dates from the 13th century. The spire was damaged in a storm of 1703. The church has been designated by English Heritage as a grade I listed building. Within the church is a 15th-century tomb of John Harrington who fought alongside Henry V in France in 1417.

Cultural references

"Person from Porlock"

In 1797, poet Samuel Taylor Coleridge, who lived nearby at Nether Stowey (between Bridgwater and Minehead), but — due to illness — had "retired to a lonely farm house between Porlock and Lynton", was interrupted during composition of his poem Kubla Khan by "a person on business from Porlock", and claimed he found afterwards he could not remember what had come to him in a dream.

Coleridge and William Wordsworth (who lived nearby at Alfoxden) would often roam the hills and coast on long night walks, leading to local gossip that they were 'spies' for the French. The Government sent an agent to investigate, but found they were "mere poets".  Their walks are celebrated by the Coleridge Way which ends in Porlock. Their friend Robert Southey published a poem titled "Porlock" in 1798.

William Blake
Legend has it that the area beyond Culbone towards Lynmouth where Glenthorne is now situated is where Jesus may have alighted on a trip with Joseph of Arimathea.  This is said to have inspired a passage from William Blake's famous poem, Milton:

Other cultural references
A song, titled "Another one from Porlock", is found on the Penguin Cafe Orchestra album Union Cafe.
In Iris Murdoch's "Bruno's Dream", Miles admonishes Diana for porlocking while he is trying to receive poetic inspiration.

Notable person
Michael McMaster (1896–1965), cricketer and Royal Naval Air Service officer

Bibliography
Hook, Rev. Walter, The History of the Ancient Church of Porlock and of the Patron Saint St Dubricius and his Times. (The author was rector of Porlock)
Halliday, Mrs. M. The Porlock Monuments. (The author lived at Glenthorne, Porlock)
Chadwyck Healey, C. The Ports of West Somerset.
Grimble, Ian. The Harington Family.

References

External links

 Porlock Tourist Association
 Porlock Vale Community

Villages in West Somerset
Exmoor
Civil parishes in Somerset
Populated coastal places in Somerset
Beaches of Somerset